Barate Gadar is a village and gram panchayat in Salarpur block, Budaun district, Uttar Pradesh, India. Its village code is 128235. According to 2011 Census of India, the total population of the village is 2,620 out of 1,422 are males and 1,198 are females.

References

Villages in Budaun district